Heber Hampton Newsome (December 13, 1909 – December 15, 1965) was a starting pitcher in Major League Baseball who played his entire career for the Boston Red Sox between the  and  seasons. A native of Ahoskie, North Carolina, he graduated from Wake Forest University.

In his rookie year, Newsome won 19 games (third in the American League) and compiled 10 shutouts, leading a Red Sox pitching rotation that included Charlie Wagner, Mickey Harris, Joe Dobson and Lefty Grove. He was considered for the MVP Award, ending ninth in the ballot.

But Newsome slumped badly the next two years, winning only eight games in each of them. After the 1943 season, he served in the Army during World War II, and then returned to his farm.

In a three-season career, Newsome posted a 35–33 record with 138 strikeouts and a 4.50 ERA in 526.0 innings pitched.

Newsome died in an automobile accident in Ahoskie, North Carolina, just two days after he turned 56 years old.

Sources

Baseball Historian
Dick Newsome Baseball Biography

Boston Red Sox players
Major League Baseball pitchers
Baseball players from North Carolina
Wake Forest University alumni
Road incident deaths in North Carolina
1909 births
1965 deaths
People from Ahoskie, North Carolina
Greensboro Patriots players
Houston Buffaloes players
Rochester Red Wings players
Springfield Cardinals players
Sacramento Solons players
San Diego Padres (minor league) players
Portland Beavers players
United States Army personnel of World War II